WWPC (91.7 FM) is a non-commercial educational radio station licensed to serve New Durham, New Hampshire, United States. The station is owned by Word Radio Educational Foundation. WWPC broadcasts a Christian radio format as a simulcast of WRKJ (88.5 FM) in Westbrook, Maine.

History
This station received its original construction permit from the Federal Communications Commission on August 9, 1991. The new station was assigned the WWPC call sign by the FCC on August 23, 1991.

WWPC filed an application for its license to cover from the FCC on January 5, 1993. The FCC accepted the application for filing, but did not issue the station its broadcast license until February 12, 2016.

References

External links
WWPC official website

WPC
Radio stations established in 1993
Strafford County, New Hampshire
Moody Radio affiliate stations
1993 establishments in New Hampshire